The 1976 Tendring District Council election took place on 6 May 1976 to elect members of Tendring District Council in England. This was the same day as other local elections held across the United Kingdom.

Summary

Election result

|}

References

Tendring District Council elections
1976 English local elections
1970s in Essex